Coccaglio is a town and comune in the province of Brescia, in Lombardy, Italy.

It was the birthplace, in 1553, of Luca Marenzio, one of the most influential composers of madrigals of the late 16th century.

References

Cities and towns in Lombardy